Halfway to Hazard is the self-titled debut studio album by American country music duo Halfway to Hazard. It was released through a joint venture of Mercury Nashville Records and StyleSonic Records on August 14, 2007. The tracks "Daisy" and "Devil and the Cross" were both released as singles. The album was produced by singer Tim McGraw, owner of the StyleSonic label, and Byron Gallimore, who has co-produced all of McGraw's albums. The song 8."Country 'Til the Day I Die" was featured in NASCAR 08.

Critical reception
David McPherson of Country Standard Time gave the album a positive review, stating that "This country fried concoction blends Southern rock with a generous helping of modern country for a concoction that goes down as smooth as bourbon from their home state."

Tracks

Personnel
Halfway to Hazard
 David Tolliver - Guitar, vocals, synthesizer, harmonica, kazoo, mandolin, crowd noise, background vocals
 Chad Warrix - banjo, acoustic guitar, electric guitar, mandolin, slide guitar, crowd noise, vocals

Additional Musicians
 Tom Bukovac - acoustic guitar, electric guitar
 Paul Bushnell - bass guitar
 Joanna Cotten - background vocals
 Dan Dugmore - Dobro, acoustic guitar, lap steel guitar, pedal steel guitar
 Edward Eason - slide guitar
 Shannon Forrest - drums, percussion
 Byron Gallimore - synthesizer
 Eric Gallimore - crowd noise
 Rob Hajacos - fiddle
 Tony Harrell - clavinet, piano, organ
 Sara Lesher - crowd noise
 Greg Morrow - drums, percussion
 Glenn Worf - bass guitar
 Jonathan Yudkin - bouzouki, mandolin, strings

Chart performance

References

2007 debut albums
Albums produced by Byron Gallimore
Halfway to Hazard albums
Mercury Nashville albums
Albums produced by Tim McGraw